Lakdar Bouzid (born 4 January 1936) is a Tunisian modern pentathlete. He competed at the 1960 Summer Olympics.

References

1936 births
Living people
Tunisian male modern pentathletes
Olympic modern pentathletes of Tunisia
Modern pentathletes at the 1960 Summer Olympics
People from Gafsa Governorate
20th-century Tunisian people